Sharon Maguire (born 17 August 1963) is a film director best known for directing Bridget Jones's Diary. The film was based on the book by her close friend Helen Fielding, and one of the main characters – "Shazza" – is allegedly based on Maguire.

Early life 
Born in Coventry to Irish Catholic parents, Maguire studied English and drama at the University of Wales Aberystwyth. After leaving university she worked as a copywriter in publishing before doing a postgraduate degree in journalism at City University, London.

Career 

She began a career in television, working as a researcher for The Media Show (C4) and then as a producer/director at the BBC's The Late Show. She then went on to direct several documentaries for BBC's Omnibus and Bookmark, before leaving the corporation to direct commercials.  Bridget Jones's Diary marked Maguire's feature directorial debut.

In 2001, she directed Bridget Jones's Diary, which was praised by critics.

In 2016, she co-founded the television production company, 7 Stories, which creates scripted drama for TV.

Personal life
She has two children with her partner, director Anand Tucker.

Filmography

Films

Documentary

TV

References

External links

1960 births
Living people
Alumni of Aberystwyth University
Alumni of City, University of London
Alumni of the University of Wales
Welsh film directors
Welsh screenwriters
Welsh television directors
Welsh women film directors
People from Aberystwyth
British women screenwriters
British women film directors
People from Coventry
British women television directors